John Delavau Bryant (1811–1877) was an American physician, poet, author, and editor.

Biography

He was born in 1811 in Philadelphia to Episcopalian minister, the Rev. William Bryant. His mother, was a daughter of John Delavau, a shipbuilder of Philadelphia.

His early education was under his father and in the Episcopalian Academy. He received the degree of A.B. in 1839, and A.M. in 1842 from the University of Pennsylvania, and entered the General Theological Seminary of the Protestant Episcopal Church in New York in 1839.

After one year he left the seminary to travel in Europe. On his return he was received into the Catholic Church at St. John's Church, Philadelphia on February 12, 1842. He graduated in medicine at the University of Pennsylvania in 1848.

In 1855, during the yellow fever epidemic in Portsmouth and Norfolk, Virginia, he volunteered for duty and returned only after the epidemic had subsided. In 1857, he married Miss Mary Harriet Riston, daughter of George Riston. For two years in the early sixties he was editor of the Catholic Herald.

Works

His principal work, published in 1859 by subscription, is an epic poem entitled The Redemption, apparently inspired by a visit to Jerusalem. It is founded on the Bible and Catholic tradition.

He also published, about 1852, a controversial novel entitled Pauline Seward which had considerable vogue at the time, especially among Catholics, and ran through ten editions. In 1855 he published The Immaculate Conception of the Blessed Virgin Mary, Mother of God, an exposition of the dogma recently promulgated.

References

Attribution
 The entry cites:
Records of the Amer. Catholic Hist. Soc., September, 1904.

1811 births
1877 deaths
19th-century American poets
American male poets
Physicians from Pennsylvania
American Roman Catholic poets
19th-century American male writers
Converts to Roman Catholicism from Anglicanism
American male non-fiction writers